Seven Hills is a city in Cuyahoga County, Ohio, United States. The population was 11,720 at the 2020 census.

Geography
Seven Hills is located at  (41.387703, -81.675350).

History
Seven Hills was incorporated as a village in 1927, from the remaining unincorporated portion of Independence Township.

Demographics

2010 census
As of the census of 2010, there were 11,804 people, 4,989 households, and 3,586 families living in the city. The racial makeup of the city was 95.6% White, 0.8% African American, 0.1% Native American, 2.5% Asian, 0.2% from other races, and 0.7% from two or more races. Hispanic or Latino of any race were 1.3% of the population.

There were 4,989 households, of which 21.5% had children under the age of 18 living with them, 61.0% were married couples living together, 7.7% had a female householder with no husband present, 3.2% had a male householder with no wife present, and 28.1% were non-families. 24.8% of all households were made up of individuals, and 14.4% had someone living alone who was 65 years of age or older. The average household size was 2.36 and the average family size was 2.82.

The median age in the city was 50 years. 16.3% of residents were under the age of 18; 5.7% were between the ages of 18 and 24; 19.7% were from 25 to 44; 32% were from 45 to 64; and 26.3% were 65 years of age or older. The gender makeup of the city was 48.7% male and 51.3% female.

2000 census
As of the census of 2000, there were 12,080 people, 4,787 households, and 3,757 families living in the city. The population density was 2,411.6 people per square mile (931.0/km). There were 4,883 housing units at an average density of 974.8 per square mile (376.3/km). The racial makeup of the city was 97.18% White, 0.15% African American, 0.02% Native American, 2.12% Asian, 0.11% from other races, and 0.42% from two or more races. Hispanic or Latino of any race were 0.76% of the population.

There were 4,787 households, out of which 22.7% had children under the age of 18 living with them, 68.2% were married couples living together, 7.5% had a female householder with no husband present, and 21.5% were non-families. 19.4% of all households were made up of individuals, and 12.3% had someone living alone who was 65 years of age or older. The average household size was 2.52 and the average family size was 2.89.

In the city the population was spread out, with 18.2% under the age of 18, 5.2% from 18 to 24, 23.4% from 25 to 44, 27.4% from 45 to 64, and 25.8% who were 65 years of age or older. The median age was 47 years. For every 100 females, there were 93.1 males. For every 100 females age 18 and over, there were 91.7 males.

The median income for a household in the city was $54,413, and the median income for a family was $62,520. Males had a median income of $44,500 versus $31,047 for females. The per capita income for the city was $25,014. About 2.0% of families and 2.6% of the population were below the poverty line, including 4.0% of those under age 18 and 2.2% of those age 65 or over.

Notable people
 Stephen "Suede" Baum, fashion designer and Project Runway contestant
 Dana Brooke (Ashley Mae Sebera), professional wrestler
 Andrew Carmellini, chef and restaurateur
 John Demjanjuk, accused Nazi collaborator
 Joe Papp, professional cyclist 
 Jack Squirek, former professional football player
 Julian Stanczak, painter and printmaker

References

Surrounding communities

External links

 City of Seven Hills
 School District Information 

Cities in Ohio
Cities in Cuyahoga County, Ohio
Cleveland metropolitan area